The 20th Division (20. Division) was a unit of the Prussian/German Army. It was formed on October 11, 1866, and was headquartered in Hannover.  The division was subordinated in peacetime to the X Army Corps (X. Armeekorps).  The division was disbanded in 1919 during the demobilization of the German Army after World War I.

Recruitment

During the Franco-Prussian War, the division was a mixed unit, with Hannoverian, Brunswick and Westphalian elements. It was subsequently reorganized so that it was recruited primarily from the former Kingdom of Hannover, which had become the Prussian Province of Hanover after 1866, along with the Duchy of Brunswick.

Combat chronicle

During the Franco-Prussian War, the 20th Infantry Division fought in the battles of Mars-la-Tour and Gravelotte, and then in the Siege of Metz. It then fought in the Loire Campaign, including the battles of Beaune-la-Rolande, Orléans, Beaugency-Cravant, and Le Mans.

In World War I in 1914, the 20th Infantry Division fought in the Allied Great Retreat, including the Battle of St. Quentin and the First Battle of the Marne. It was sent to the Eastern Front in 1915 and again twice more, seeing action in the Gorlice-Tarnów Offensive and the Russian Brusilov Offensive. It returned to the Western Front and after a period in the trenches saw action in the Battle of Passchendaele and the German 1918 Spring Offensive.  The division was rated a first class division by Allied intelligence.

Order of battle in the Franco-Prussian War

During wartime, the 20th Division, like other regular German divisions, was redesignated an infantry division. The organization of the 20th Infantry Division in 1870 at the beginning of the Franco-Prussian War was as follows:

39. Infanterie-Brigade
Infanterie-Regiment Nr. 17
Infanterie-Regiment Nr. 56
40. Infanterie-Brigade
Infanterie-Regiment Nr. 70
Braunschweigisches Infanterie-Regiment Nr. 92
Jäger-Bataillon Nr. 10
Dragoner-Regiment Nr. 16

Pre-World War I organization

German divisions underwent various organizational changes after the Franco-Prussian War. As noted above, the 20th Division was reorganized to become primarily a Hannover/Brunswick unit. The organization of the 20th Division in 1914, shortly before the outbreak of World War I, was as follows:

39. Infanterie-Brigade 
Infanterie-Regiment von Voigts-Rhetz (3. Hannoversches) Nr. 79
4. Hannoversches Infanterie-Regiment Nr. 164
40.Infanterie-Brigade
2. Hannoversches Infanterie-Regiment Nr. 77
Braunschweigisches Infanterie-Regiment Nr. 92 
20.Kavallerie-Brigade
2. Hannoversches Dragoner-Regiment Nr. 16
Braunschweigisches Husaren-Regiment Nr. 17 
20. Feldartillerie-Brigade
Feldartillerie-Regiment von Scharnhorst (1. Hannoversches) Nr. 10  
Niedersächsisches Feldartillerie-Regiment Nr. 46 
Landwehr-Inspektion Hannover

Order of battle on mobilization

On mobilization in August 1914 at the beginning of World War I, most divisional cavalry, including brigade headquarters, was withdrawn to form cavalry divisions or split up among divisions as reconnaissance units.  Divisions received engineer companies and other support units from their higher headquarters.  The 20th Division was again renamed the 20th Infantry Division and its initial wartime organization was as follows:

39. Infanterie-Brigade
Infanterie-Regiment von Voigts-Rhetz (3. Hannoversches) Nr. 79
4. Hannoversches Infanterie-Regiment Nr. 164
Hannoversches Jäger-Bataillon Nr. 10 
40.Infanterie-Brigade
2. Hannoversches Infanterie-Regiment Nr. 77
Braunschweigisches Infanterie-Regiment Nr. 92 
Stab und "1/2"-Regiment/Braunschweigisches Husaren-Regiment Nr. 17 
20. Feldartillerie-Brigade
Feldartillerie-Regiment von Scharnhorst (1. Hannoversches) Nr. 10  
Niedersächsisches Feldartillerie-Regiment Nr. 46 
2.Kompanie/Hannoversches Pionier-Bataillon Nr. 10 
3.Kompanie/Hannoversches Pionier-Bataillon Nr. 10

Late World War I organization

Divisions underwent many changes during the war, with regiments moving from division to division, and some being destroyed and rebuilt.  During the war, most divisions became triangular - one infantry brigade with three infantry regiments rather than two infantry brigades of two regiments (a "square division"). An artillery commander replaced the artillery brigade headquarters, the cavalry was further reduced, the engineer contingent was increased, and a divisional signals command was created. The 20th Infantry Division's order of battle on March 20, 1918, was as follows:

40. Infanterie-Brigade
2. Hannoversches Infanterie-Regiment Nr. 77
Infanterie-Regiment von Voigts-Rhetz (3. Hannoversches) Nr. 79
Braunschweigisches Infanterie-Regiment Nr. 92 
Maschinengewehr-Scharfschützen-Abteilung Nr. 32
5.Eskadron/Braunschweigisches Husaren-Regiment Nr. 17
Artillerie-Kommandeur 20
Niedersächsisches Feldartillerie-Regiment Nr. 46
Fußartillerie-Bataillon Nr. 155 
Stab Pionier-Bataillon Nr. 10
2.Kompanie/Hannoversches Pionier-Bataillon Nr. 10 
3.Kompanie/Hannoversches Pionier-Bataillon Nr. 10
Minenwerfer-Kompanie Nr. 20
Divisions-Nachrichten-Kommandeur 20

References
 20. Infanterie-Division  (Chronik 1914/1918) - Der erste Weltkrieg
 Claus von Bredow, bearb., Historische Rang- und Stammliste des deutschen Heeres (1905)
 Hermann Cron et al., Ruhmeshalle unserer alten Armee (Berlin, 1935)
 Hermann Cron, Geschichte des deutschen Heeres im Weltkriege 1914-1918 (Berlin, 1937)
 Günter Wegner, Stellenbesetzung der deutschen Heere 1815-1939. (Biblio Verlag, Osnabrück, 1993), Bd. 1
 Histories of Two Hundred and Fifty-One Divisions of the German Army which Participated in the War (1914–1918), compiled from records of Intelligence section of the General Staff, American Expeditionary Forces, at General Headquarters, Chaumont, France 1919 (1920)

Notes

Infantry divisions of Germany in World War I
Military units and formations established in 1866
Military units and formations disestablished in 1919
1866 establishments in Prussia